Real, Dume e Semelhe is a civil parish in the municipality of Braga, Portugal. It was formed in 2013 by the merger of the former parishes Real, Dume and Semelhe. The population in 2011 was 11,700, in an area of 8.47 km².

Main sights

Chapel of São Frutuoso

References

Freguesias of Braga